Prunus samydoides is a species of Prunus native to Mexico. It is a small tree, with approximately 9cm long oval-lanceolate evergreen leaves.

Ecology
It is found growing in montane cloud forests of eastern Mexico, some of which are relict Fagus mexicana stands.

References

samydoides
Endemic flora of Mexico
Flora of Hidalgo (state)
Flora of Querétaro
Flora of Veracruz
Plants described in 1839